This museum is now closed. Try the Uta Memorial Museum near Meijijingumae Station to see Ukiyo-e prints from Hiroshige, Hokusai and others.

 is located in Bunkyō, Tokyo, Japan. Its collection includes ukiyo-e genre paintings from the Edo period, in particular, prints by Utamaro, Hokusai and Hiroshige. Every month the museum changes the ukiyo-e exhibition. This small museum was opened in November 1998.  Its aim is to promote understanding of ukiyo-e culture.

The museum is about 2 minutes on foot from Kōrakuen Station, near the Bunkyo Civic Center. It is open　from 11:00 until 18:00, and the entrance fee is 500 yen.

External links
 Museum's Homepage (Japanese)
 Bunkyo City Information

Buildings and structures in Bunkyō
Art museums and galleries in Tokyo
1998 establishments in Japan
Art museums established in 1998
Ukiyo-e Museum